Richard Padmore (1789 – 12 January 1881) was a British Liberal Party politician and industrialist.

Industrial career
Born in Wellington, Shropshire as the son of Thomas and Mary Padmore, Padmore joined Worcester-based lamppost, tram wire posts and engine supplier Hardy and Co, founded by Robert and John Hardy, in 1820. He became a partner in 1829 and the firm then became known as Hardy and Padmore. This partnership was later dissolved in 1851, with the firm entering voluntary liquidation long after Padmore's death in 1967.

Political career

Padmore was Worcester's first non-conformist mayor—rejecting a procession to the cathedral or his place of worship and refusing to wear a mayoral robe—from 1849 to 1849, and from 1852 to 1853 before being elected Liberal MP for Worcester at a by-election in 1860—caused by the resignation of William Laslett. He held the seat until 1868 when he did not seek re-election.

References

External links
 

Liberal Party (UK) MPs for English constituencies
People from Wellington, Shropshire
History of Worcester, England
UK MPs 1859–1865
UK MPs 1865–1868
1789 births
1881 deaths